The Legislative Assembly of Leningrad Oblast is the regional parliament of Leningrad Oblast, a federal subject of Russia. A total of 50 deputies are elected for five-year terms.

It autonomously exercises its roles using the Constitution of the Russian Federation, federal legislation, the Statute of Leningrad Oblast, and regional laws as guides. The Legislative Assembly is a legal entity. Acts passed by it are binding on all bodies and officials of state authorities and local governments of Leningrad Oblast, organizations, and private citizens.

Elections

2016

2021

References

External links
Official site

Politics of Leningrad Oblast
Leningrad Oblast
Leningrad Oblast
1994 establishments in Russia